The Barossa Rams Rugby Club is a South Australian rugby union club from the Barossa Valley wine region and based in the town of Lyndoch, 58 km northeast of Adelaide.

As of 2018, the club fields two men's teams, a women's team and junior teams age-graded from under-7 through to under-18. The Rams home ground is Lyndoch Oval. The club's jersey is black and hot pink.

History
The team was founded in 1977 as the Roseworthy College Rugby Club. The college subsequently became part of University of Adelaide in 1991 and, when the funding for rugby was withdrawn by the college in 2006, the club relocated to Lyndoch and became the Barossa Rams. In 2013 the Rams were promoted to Premier Grade in the South Australian Rugby competition.

References

Rugby union teams in South Australia